Cowboys and Outlaws is a documentary series on The History Channel that details key figures and events in the history of the American West in the latter half of the 19th century. It uses dramatic reenactments, historian interviews and forensic evidence to highlight famous figures such as Billy the Kid, Wyatt Earp and Tom Horn. It also covers historical events such as the first drive along the Goodnight-Loving Trail and the transformation of Abilene, Kansas from a small settlement into a major cattle town.

As of February, 2010, only six episodes have aired. A DVD collection was released on January 26, 2010.

Episodes
 The Real McCoy
 The Real Wyatt Earp
 The Real Lonesome Dove
 Frontier Hitman
 Range War
 The Real Billy the Kid
 Tom Horn

References

External links
 

2010 American television series debuts
2010 American television series endings
2010s American documentary television series
History (American TV channel) original programming